Johann VII of Mecklenburg (7 March 1558 – 22 March 1592) (sometimes called Johann V, and usually translated to John VII or John V) was a Duke of Mecklenburg-Schwerin.

Biography
Johann was the son of John Albert I, Duke of Mecklenburg-Güstrow and Schwerin (1525–1576), and his wife Duchess Anna Sophia of Prussia (1527–1591).  He was eighteen years old when his father died. A regency council was appointed that ruled in his name for the next nine years.

The regency handed over the actual rule of his territories to him in 1585. He immediately faced problems he was ill-equipped to deal with, including massive debt and his uncle Christopher's demands for territorial concessions. After an especially harsh argument with his uncle, he committed suicide.

Since suicides could not be buried in hallowed ground, a story was concocted which alleged that Johann had been killed by the devil as part of a pact with two women from Schwerin. The women were questioned: Katharina Wankelmuth, who died from the effects of torture, and Magdalena Rukitz, who was burned at the stake. Their condemnation as witches cleared the way for Johann's burial in Schwerin Cathedral.

Marriage and children
On 17 February 1588 Johann married Sophia (1 June 1569 – 14 November 1634), a daughter of Adolf, Duke of Holstein-Gottorp, and his wife Christine of Hesse. They had three children:
Adolf Frederick I (15 December 1588 – 27 February 1658)
John Albert II (5 May 1590 – 23 April 1636)
Anna Sophia (19 September 1591 – 11 February 1648)

Ancestry

References
Friedrich Wigger (1885) (in German). "Stammtafeln des Großherzoglichen Hauses von Meklenburg" In: Verein für Mecklenburgische Geschichte und Altertumskunde: Jahrbücher des Vereins für Mecklenburgische Geschichte und Altertumskunde. – Band 50, p. 292.

Dukes of Mecklenburg-Schwerin
House of Mecklenburg-Schwerin
1558 births
1592 deaths
Burials at Schwerin Cathedral
People from Güstrow
Suicides in Germany